Boneh-ye Sib (also Romanized as Boneh-ye Sīb and Boneh Sīb) is a village in Amjaz Rural District, in the Central District of Anbarabad County, Kerman Province, Iran. At the 2006 census, its population was 11, in 6 families.

References 

Populated places in Anbarabad County